Lore is the first full-length album by Canadian progressive metal band Today I Caught the Plague. Released June 14, 2011 Independently. This album doesn't feature the dirty vocal style that their 2008 EP, Ms. Mary Mallon, had opting for cleanly sung vocals only instead of the growls that were heard throughout the EP. The lyrics for this album are particular to an underlining theme of various mythologies; from Egyptian, Asian, and even Oceanic myths encompassed by the umbrella title of the album "Lore". This was the last release under the name Today I Caught the Plague.

Track listing

Personnel
Today I Caught the Plague
Dave Journeaux – vocals
Ben Davis – guitar
Steve Rennie - guitar
Mike Ieradi - drums
Eric Stone - bass guitar
Matt Young - keyboard
Production
Produced by Anthony Calabretta & Cameron McLellan

References

The Kindred (band) albums
2011 albums